Tineomigma is a genus of moths belonging to the family Tineidae.

There is presently only one species in this genus, Tineomigma transiens  Gozmány, 2004 that is known from Namibia.

References

Gozmány L. A. 2004. Tineidae (Lepidoptera, Tineoidea). – In: Mey, Z. (Ed.) The Lepidoptera of the Brandberg Massif in Namibia. - Esperiana Memoir 1:51–64.

Hieroxestinae
Monotypic moth genera